"Does Fort Worth Ever Cross Your Mind" is a song written by Sanger D. Shafer and Darlene Shafer, and recorded by American country music artist George Strait.  It was released in September 1984 as the lead-off single and title track from his album of the same name.  It reached number one on the country music charts in the United States, and number 10 in Canada.

Content
The song is about a guy back in Fort Worth, Texas. He’s enjoying a few beers and thinking about his former woman who’s now with someone else in nearby Dallas. The guy wonders if she ever thinks of him and the good times they had together.

Critical reception
Kevin John Coyne of Country Universe gave the song a 'B' grade, saying that it "has a great opening line" and a "more confident vocal and a Texas-centric focus certainly would’ve made it stand out back in 1984."

Other versions
Moe Bandy recorded the song for his 1977 album I'm Sorry for You My Friend. Keith Whitley recorded the song also in 1984, and released it to radio as a non-album track. It received moderate airplay.

Chart positions

References

1984 singles
Moe Bandy songs
George Strait songs
Songs about Texas
Songs written by Sanger D. Shafer
Song recordings produced by Jimmy Bowen
MCA Records singles
1977 songs